Royce K. Wallace (May 9, 1925 – November 24, 1992) was an American actress, singer and dancer who had a long, distinguished career beginning in the 1940s through the late–1980s.

Biography
Born in Buffalo, Nebraska or Pleasanton, Nebraska or Cleveland, Ohio (sources differ), Wallace began her acting career on Broadway. Wallace received her first role as a dancer in Carmen Jones in 1943 which ran on Broadway for two years. Wallace appeared in productions throughout the 1940s, 1950s and 1960s such as Funny Girl in 1964. In the 1960s, Wallace was a founding co-member of the Cambridge Players theatrical group, a group which included some of the distinguished black actresses such as Esther Rolle (of Good Times TV show fame), Lynn Hamilton (who starred as "Donna" on the hit NBC-TV sitcom Sanford and Son), and Helen Martin of NBC-TV's 227.

Wallace later appeared mostly in guest roles on Sanford and Son, Barnaby Jones, The Paper Chase, Benson, Soap, Quincy, M.E., and Roots: The Next Generations. Wallace also appeared as Agnes, in an episode of Barnaby Jones entitled “Theater Of Fear”, alongside actress Anne Francis.

Personal life and Death
Wallace was married twice and had no children. On December 24, 1956, Wallace married Bermuda socialite Alexander Stuart Outerbridge. Wallace later filed for divorce from Outerbridge in December 1958. In 1960, Wallace married New York City fireman Bill Riley.
Wallace died on November 24, 1992, in Ventura, California, at the age of 67.

Filmography

References

External links

American stage actresses
American female dancers
American television actresses
Place of birth missing
1925 births
1992 deaths
African-American female dancers
African-American dancers
20th-century American musicians
20th-century American actresses
Modern dancers
African-American actresses
African-American women musicians
20th-century African-American women
20th-century African-American musicians